The men's triple jump event  at the 1979 European Athletics Indoor Championships was held on 25 February in Vienna.

Results

References

Triple jump at the European Athletics Indoor Championships
Triple